The Weight of the Nation is a four-part documentary series produced by American cable television network HBO. Addressing the growing obesity epidemic in the United States, it was first aired in May 2012. The documentary series included collaboration with National Institutes of Health, Centers for Disease Control and Prevention and the Institute of Medicine. The series was produced by John Hoffman.

The scientific commentators featured in the documentary include Francis Collins, Samuel Klein, Rudolph Leibel, Robert Lustig, and Kelly D. Brownell.

Content
The series consists of four approximately hour-long films:

 Consequences
 Choices
 Children in Crisis
 Challenges

References

External links
 HBO The Weight of the Nation site
 

Obesity
Public health
HBO original programming
2010s American documentary television series
English-language television shows